Jonquetella is a Gram-negative and strictly aerobic genus of bacteria from the family of Synergistaceae with one known species (Jonquetella anthropi). Jonquetella anthropi has been isolated from a human cyst from Montpellier in France.

References

Synergistota
Bacteria genera
Monotypic bacteria genera